Budget Host is an American lodging chain. It was founded in 1975 in Fort Worth, Texas by Ray Sawyer and Ed Semmler.

Unlike most motel chains, it uses a referral system, thus allowing independent motel operators to use the name.

Sawyer died in 2007.

See also
 List of motels

References

External links

Hotels established in 1975
Motels in the United States
Companies based in Fort Worth, Texas
Hotel chains in the United States
1975 establishments in Texas